James Island is one of South Carolina's most urban Sea Islands; nearly half of the island sits within Charleston city limits. The island is separated from peninsular downtown Charleston by the Ashley River, from the mainland by Wappoo Creek and the Wappoo Cut, and from Johns Island by the Stono River. It lies inshore of Morris Island and Folly Beach.

Fort Sumter, located on an island just off the eastern tip of James Island, is the site of the first battle of the Civil War. Bombardment of Fort Sumter was started from Fort Johnson which is located on the eastern portion of James Island.  Several significant military engagements took place on island, including the battles of Secessionville (1862), Grimball's Landing (1863) and Grimball's Causeway (1865). All of these battles were alternately known as the "Battle of James Island".

On Nov. 14, 1782, Tadeusz Kościuszko, Colonel of the Continental Army, led the last known armed action of the Revolutionary War against the British and nearly was killed. Later, The Continental Congress named Kosciuszko Brigadier General for his service in both the North, including his assistance to General Gates at the Battle of Saratoga, and brilliant efforts assisting General Greene in saving the South Region Army from Cornwallis' forces.

James Island land was long largely agricultural with Sea Island cotton forced-labor farms covering much of the island. Growth accelerated after World War II and James Island became a suburban bedroom community to Charleston.

, the United States Census Bureau reported that 33,781 people lived on the island. About one-half of the island lies within the city limits of Charleston, and the remainder of the island is made up of the Town of James Island and unincorporated areas.

There has been political discord concerning the incorporation of portions of the island into the City of Charleston. The town of James Island has been founded on three occasions. Three incorporations were overturned as a result of legal suits filed by Charleston. The third incorporation attempt was in contention in another legal suit by the city, and on November 7, 2008, the town's incorporation was upheld by a Circuit Court judge. The city of Charleston filed an appeal of the decision to the South Carolina Supreme Court. Ultimately, this ruling was overturned by the Supreme Court.

A fourth attempt at incorporation was successful, upheld by the courts and uncontested by the city of Charleston. There is now a legally formed Town of James Island.

As defined by the U.S. Census Bureau, the population of James Island is included within the Charleston-North Charleston Urbanized Area and the larger Charleston-North Charleston Metropolitan Statistical Area.

Education 
The public schools on James Island are part of the Charleston County School District and include Harborview, Stiles Point, James Island and Murray-LaSaine, and Apple Charter Elementary Schools; Camp Road Middle School, and James Island Charter High School. The high school interscholastic teams are the Trojans and wear blue and orange uniforms.

James Island had two high schools in the past: Fort Johnson High (mascot Trojans) and James Island High (mascot Rams). The two schools merged in 1983 on the Fort Johnson campus. The first school year for the combined school was 1983-1984 (class of '84).

Notable inhabitants
Stephen Colbert, comedian and political satirist, lived on James Island for part of his boyhood, along with his 10 brothers and sisters.
Langston Moore of the NFL Detroit Lions, attended James Island High School.
Samuel Smalls, the man upon whom the novel Porgy and subsequent opera Porgy and Bess are based, is buried in the cemetery beside James Island Presbyterian Church.
Gorman Thomas, Major League Baseball player, grew up on James Island and played baseball for the original James Island High School.
Roddy White, Pro Bowl wide receiver with the Atlanta Falcons, attended James Island High School.

References

External links
 James Island information

Islands of South Carolina
Islands of Charleston County, South Carolina
South Carolina Sea Islands